The National League Pairs Championship is a motorcycle speedway contest for tier three clubs in the United Kingdom. The Championship is between the top two riders from each club competing in the National League. The meetings comprise a competition between teams of two riders drawn into two qualifying groups.

Rules

Gate positions 
In the Qualification Heats, riders are allocated starting gates. For the Semi-Finals, the group winners have first choice of gate positions (A&C or B&D). Gate A is on the inside of the track, whilst Gate D is on the outside. For the Final, the gate positions (A&C and B&D) are decided by the toss of a coin.

Points scoring
All heats are scored as follows:
1st = 4pts
2nd = 3pts
3rd = 2pts
4th = 0pts

This system is used to encourage team riding. A pair finishing first and second will score seven points, whereas a pair finishing first and last will score only four. Race points scored over all 'qualification heats' are used to determine the final group placings.

Ties
Where two are tied for a place, the team who scored most points scored in the heat where they met go through. Where more than two teams are tied for a place, the tie is resolved as follows:
Most wins
Most second places
A ballot

Winners

See also
 Speedway in the United Kingdom
 List of United Kingdom Speedway Pairs champions

References

Speedway competitions in the United Kingdom